Mirny is a rural locality (a settlement) in Vtorovskoye Rural Settlement, Kameshkovsky District, Vladimir Oblast, Russia. The population was 611 as of 2010. There are 6 streets.

Geography 
Mirny is located 22 km southwest of Kameshkovo (the district's administrative centre) by road. Pishchikhino is the nearest rural locality.

References 

Rural localities in Kameshkovsky District